Minangkabau International Airport  ,  is the principal airport serving the province of West Sumatra on the island of Sumatra, Indonesia. It is located at Ketaping, Padang Pariaman Regency which is about 23 km north-west of Padang city center. The airport became operational in July 2005, replacing the old Tabing Airport in Padang. The airport is named after the Minangkabau ethnic group who inhabit the region.

History

Minangkabau International Airport is located 23 km from the center of the city of Padang, occupying an area of 427 hectares as the main gateway to West Sumatra. The airport was built in 2001, replacing Tabing Airport, which had been operating for 34 years. The relocation from Tabing Airport to Minangkabau International Airport was done because the old airport could no longer meet the requirements in terms of flight safety. The new airport construction cost approximately 9.4 billion yen, in the form of a soft loan from Japan Bank International Corporation (JICB) and the state budget of around Rp 97.6 billion (10% of it). The construction was carried out by the main contractors Shimizu and Marubeni of Japan JO and Adhi Karya from Indonesia. The airport can accommodate wide-body aircraft like Airbus A330, Boeing 747-400, or Boeing 777. Upon completion of all planned renovations, it will have better facilities for passengers and operators.

Expansion
Minangkabau International Airport is the third airport in Indonesia, after Soekarno–Hatta Airport at Cengkareng and Kuala Namu International Airport in Medan to be constructed from scratch. The airport is now undergoing development for expansion. Phase I is already completed. In phase II the terminal will be developed to 49,124 square meters to accommodate 5.9 million passengers per year. The number of check-in counters will increase to a total of 32 counters with five conveyor belt baggage luggage. The runway will expand from the current measuring 2,750 x 45 square meters to 3,000 x 45 square meters in order to accommodate the operation of larger aircraft. The number of taxiways will also increase to eight, to accelerate aircraft traffic on the air side, improve the airline's on time performance, and accommodate more flight operations.

Terminal and facilities 
There is one terminal building for both international flights and domestic flights. The airport has 17 check-in counters, five baggage conveyors, and nine ticket sales counters. The architecture of airport terminal adopting bagonjong (spired roof), Minangkabau vernacular architecture commonly found in rumah gadang traditional house.

The runway is compatible with Boeing 747 and Airbus A340 planes. 
There is an ample parking space and a range of retail stores selling various goods (especially local products).

The airport is designed to serve only 2.87 million passengers per year, but it served 4.13 million passengers in 2018. Due to overcrowding, the airport authority pledged to expand the airport capacity from current 3.84 million passengers movement to 5.7 million passengers starting from 2018. The airport authority also focuses on renovating the airport's preexisting facilities. Some facilities that have been refurbished are the toilet and the arrival gates. After finishing the first phase of development, the passenger terminal building is expanded to 36,789 square meters so it can accommodate 3.7 million passengers per year.

Airlines and destinations

Passenger

Cargo

Statistics

Ground transportation
The airport can be reached by bus service, taxi, and airport train service.

Buses

Taxi
Passengers are encouraged to use metered taxi to avoid scams. Taxis are available anytime at the taxi parking area. They are usually available from 07:00 AM to 22:30 PM.

Train

A 3.9 km railway connecting the nearby Duku Station to the newly-built Minangkabau International Airport Station has been inaugurated by President Joko Widodo on 21 May 2018. From Duku Station, the railway continues to run to Padang Station. It is the third airport rail link in Indonesia after Kualanamu Airport Rail Link and Soekarno–Hatta Airport Rail Link.

Accidents and incidents
 This airport suffered minor damage because of the late September 2009 earthquake.
 On 2 August 2015 a Citilink Airbus A320-200 overran the runway on landing at Minangkabau Airport. No casualty occurred.

References

External links

 Angkasapura2.co.id
 

Padang Pariaman Regency
Airports in Sumatra
Buildings and structures in West Sumatra
Transport in West Sumatra
Airports established in 2005